Runcinia acuminata is a species of crab spiders.

Females reach a body length of about 10 mm, males less than 6 mm. They are often found in seeding heads of grasses, where the females build and camouflage their egg sacs. They mainly feed on moths that visit these grasses.

Distribution
This species is known from Bangladesh to Japan, Borneo, New Guinea and Australia (New South Wales and Queensland).

Name
The species name is derived from Latin acuminatus "pointed".

External links
 Several pictures of a R. acuminata

Thomisidae
Spiders of Australia
Spiders of Asia
Spiders described in 1881